East River is a tidal strait in New York City.

East River may also refer to:

Communities 
 East River, Nova Scotia

Streams
 East River (Quebec), a former name of the George River
 East River (Colorado)
 East River (Florida)
 East River (Minnesota)
 East River (New River), in Virginia and West Virginia
 East River (South Dakota), a region in South Dakota
 East River (Virginia)
 East River (Wisconsin)
 East Bay River, also known as East River, in Florida
 Hillsborough River (Prince Edward Island), also known as the East River
 East River (China) (Dong River), in Kwangtung (Guangdong), China

Other uses
 "East River", a 1978 song by the Brecker Brothers
 East River (film), a 2008 short film by Marc Grey, featuring the onscreen debut of Lupita Nyong'o

See also
 Dong River (Donggang), a river in South Korea's Gangwon Province
 East Twin River (disambiguation)
 East (disambiguation)